Mardy Fish and Andy Roddick were the defending champions but lost in the semifinals to Mark Knowles and Daniel Nestor.

Knowles and Nestor won in the final 6–4, 6–3 against Jan-Michael Gambill and Graydon Oliver.

Seeds
Champion seeds are indicated in bold text while text in italics indicates the round in which those seeds were eliminated.

Draw

External links
 2003 U.S. Men's Clay Court Championships Doubles Draw

U.S. Men's Clay Court Championships
2003 U.S. Men's Clay Court Championships